Shahbaz Hussain (born 9 December 1996) is an Indian cricketer. He made his Twenty20 debut on 10 January 2021, for Chhattisgarh in the 2020–21 Syed Mushtaq Ali Trophy. He made his first-class debut on 17 February 2022, for Chhattisgarh in the 2021–22 Ranji Trophy.

References

External links
 

1996 births
Living people
Indian cricketers
Chhattisgarh cricketers
Place of birth missing (living people)